Cophyla phyllodactyla is a species of frog in the family Microhylidae.
It is endemic to Madagascar.
Its natural habitats are subtropical or tropical moist lowland forests, subtropical or tropical moist montane forests, plantations, rural gardens, and heavily degraded former forest.
It is threatened by habitat loss.

References

Cophyla
Endemic frogs of Madagascar
Taxa named by Oskar Boettger
Taxonomy articles created by Polbot
Amphibians described in 1880